The Andhra Pradesh Legislature is the state legislature of the Indian state of Andhra Pradesh. It follows a Westminster-derived parliamentary system and is composed of an
Appointed Governor of Andhra 
The indirectly-elected Śāsana Manḍali
The popularly-elected Śāsana Sabha.

The Legislature works at the transit building located in the state capital Amaravati.The legislature derives its authority from the Indian constitution, with sole authority to make laws on 61 subjects specified in the state list and shares law-making power in 52 concurrent subjects with the Parliament of India. The state uses first-past-the-post method territorial constituencies for electing members to the lower house. The members of the upper house are indirectly-elected by special constituencies or nominated by the governor. The governor is head of the state authorized to the leader of the legislature.

History
Andhra Pradesh, the first linguistic state and once the fifth largest state in the Indian union, was formed on 1 November 1956 with the unification of Andhra State and the Telugu speaking areas of the erstwhile Hyderabad State. Consequent to the formation of the State of Andhra Pradesh the 140 Members of the Andhra State Legislative Assembly and 105 Members representing the Telugu speaking areas of Hyderabad State were merged resulting in the formation of the Andhra Pradesh Legislative Assembly.

In 1956, the Andhra Pradesh Legislature was Unicameral with only a Legislative Assembly consisting 245 Members. The first meeting of the Andhra Pradesh Legislative Assembly was held on 3 December 1956. Ayyadevara Kaleswara Rao and Konda Lakshman Bapuji were elected as the first Speaker and the first Deputy Speaker respectively of the Andhra Pradesh Legislative Assembly.

In 1958, with the constitution of the Legislative Council the unicameral Andhra Pradesh Legislature has become bicameral. Due to delimitation of constituencies several ups and downs have taken place in the number of elected Members of Legislative Assembly in Andhra Pradesh.  In 1956 it was 245, in 1962 it was 300, in 1967 and 1972 it was 287 and from 1978 onwards it is 294. In 2014, the state was bifurcated into Andhra Pradesh and Telangana. The present strength of the Andhra Pradesh Legislative Assembly is 175.

B. V. Subba Reddy was the only Presiding Officer who has been elected twice as Speaker in 1962 and 1967 unanimously in the Third and Fourth Andhra Pradesh Legislative Assembly. The most significant feature of the Fourth Legislative Assembly is that it has the highest number of Independents in the House. Out of the 294 elected Members of the Legislative Assembly 68 Members were Independents. P. Ranga Reddy, who has been elected as Speaker in 1972 by the Fifth Andhra Pradesh Legislative Assembly also served as the Chairman of the Andhra Pradesh Legislative Council from 1968 to 1972. He was the only person who has served as the Presiding Officer for both the Houses of Andhra Pradesh Legislature. He was also appointed as Pro-tem Speaker for the Eighth Andhra Pradesh Legislative Assembly in 1985.

In the history of the Andhra Pradesh Legislature the Seventh Legislative Assembly was the shortest Assembly in terms of its tenure. Another important feature of the Seventh Assembly was when the first Confidence Motion was moved and carried in the House on 20 September 1984. The Eleventh Legislative Assembly which was constituted on 10 October 1999 elected K. Prathibha Bharathi as Speaker, the first women Presiding Officer of the Andhra Pradesh Legislature.

A. P. J. Abdul Kalam, the President of India addressed the Twelfth Legislative Assembly on 14 July 2004. It was the second time in the history of the Andhra Pradesh Legislature that the First Citizen of India has addressed the Legislative Assembly. Previously, Dr. Neelam Sanjeeva Reddy addressed the Members of the Legislature on 28 June 1978.

Structure and lawmaking process 
According to the Indian Constitution, every state in India shall have a legislature consisting of the Governor and a legislative assembly. Further, the legislative assembly of the state can decide to create an upper house – the council or abolish the upper house at any point of time. This relation between the two houses was specified in the constitution to strike a balance between large and small states – with the former demanding for more political participation, while the latter citing financial constraints in maintaining two houses. Andhra Pradesh is one of the few states in India to have a bicameral legislature. The state established an upper house in 1957, abolished in 1985 and re-established it in 2007.

The upper house cannot be dissolved and one third of its members retire every second year. The term of the legislative assembly is five years from the date appointed for its first meeting. The cabinet is collectively responsible to the lower house and is in power as long as it enjoys the confidence of the lower house. Ministers are generally members of the lower house, however, they can be a member of either house.

A bill can originate in either house, though money bills can originate only in the lower house. The upper house can only suggest modifications to the bill which is passed by the assembly. If the assembly decides to ignore the changes made by the upper house in its second reading, the council has to accept the bill in original form passed by the assembly. The only power of the council, in ordinary or money bills is to introduce some delay into the legislative process. The bill is then sent to the Governor, who may sign the bill converting it into law or reject it.

Membership and elections 
Of the total number of Members of the Legislative Council (58), one third of Members are elected by electorates consisting of the Members of Local Authorities(20), 1/12 are elected by electorates consisting of graduates residing in the State(5), 1/12 are elected by electorates consisting of persons engaged in teaching(5), 1/3 are elected by the Members of Legislative Assembly (20) and the remaining are nominated by the Governor(8). The specified electorate is divided into territorial constituencies and members are elected on a first-past-the-post basis.

The Legislative Assembly consists of 175 elected members and one member nominated by the Governor from among the Anglo-Indian Community, under Article 333 of the Constitution of India. All persons residing in the state above the age of 18 are eligible to vote in the elections.

Seat of the assembly
The assembly meets at temporary facilities in the Velagapudi neighbourhood of the new capital city of Andhra Pradesh, Amaravati, having relocated there in March 2017. The first session of the legislature at the new capital began on 6 March 2017.

The assembly met at the State Assembly Building in Hyderabad till March 2017. This was built in 1913 and adjoins the picturesque public gardens known as the hanging gardens.

Composition

Speakers

Andhra state Legislative Assembly (1953–1956) 
 Nallapati Venkataramaiah Chowdary, 23 November 1953 to 21 April 1956, Guntur district
 R. Lakshminarasimham Dora. 23 April 1955 to 3 December 1956, Srikakulam district

Andhra Pradesh Legislative Assembly  (1956–2014) 
 Ayyadevara Kaleswara Rao, 4 December 1956 to 26 February 1962, Krishna district
 B. V. Subba Reddy, 20 March 1962 to 29 September 1971, Kurnool district
 K. V. Vema Reddy, 25 November 1971 to 19 March 1972, Ananthapur district
 Pidatala Ranga reddy, 21 March 1972 to 25 September 1974, Prakasam district
 R. Dasaratha Rami Reddy, 28 January 1975 to 14 March 1978, Nellore district
 Divi Kondaiah Chowdary, 16 March 1978 to 16 October 1980, Prakasam district
 Kona Prabhakara Rao, 24 February 1980 to 22 September 1981, Guntur district
 Agarala Eswara Reddi, 7 September 1982 to 16 January 1983, Chittoor district
 Tangi Satyanarayana, 18 January 1983 to 28 August 1984, Srikakulam district
 Nissankarrao venkat ratnam, 20 September 1984 to 10 January 1985, Guntur district
 G. Narayana Rao, 12 March 1985 to 27 October 1989, Karimnagar district
 P. Ramachandra Reddy, 4 January 1990 to 22 December 1990, Medak district
 D. Sripada Rao, 19 August 1991 to 11 January 1995, Karimnagar district
 Yanamala Rama Krishnudu, 12 January 1995 to 10 October 1999, East Godavari district
 K. Pratibha Bharati, 11 November 1999 to 30 May 2004, Srikakulam district
 K. R. Suresh Reddy, 1 June 2004 to 3 June 2009, Nizamabad district
 Kiran Kumar Reddy, 4 June 2009 to 24 November 2010, Chittoor district
 Nadendla Manohar, 4 June 2011 to 18 June 2014, Guntur district

Andhra Pradesh Legislative Council  (2007 - 2014)
 A. Chakrapani, 1.04.2007-27.05.2014(?)

Andhra Pradesh Legislative Assembly (2014 – )
 Kodela Siva Prasada Rao, 18 June 2014 to 30 May 2019, Guntur district
 Thammineni Seetharam, 08.06.2019–, Srikakulam district

Andhra Pradesh Legislative Council (2014 - )
 N. M. D. Farooq, 15.11.2017–10.11.2018, Kurnool district
 Shariff Mohammed Ahmed, 07.02.2019–31.05.2021, West Godavari district
 Koyye Moshenu Raju, 19.11.2021–, West Godavari district

Legislative Assembly Constituencies 

There are a total of 175 Assembly Constituencies, across 13 undivided districts, in the state of Andhra Pradesh.

Legislative Assembly terms 
The following are the years of constitution and dissolution of the Andhra Pradesh Legislative Assembly.

See also
Elections in Andhra Pradesh
List of chairpersons of the Andhra Pradesh Legislative Council

References

External 

 AP Assembly official site
 List of MLAs on aponline.gov.in
 Andhra Pradesh Assembly Segments

 
A
Buildings and structures in Hyderabad, India
Government of Andhra Pradesh
Bicameral legislatures
Defunct unicameral legislatures